is a 1960 Japanese Sun Tribe film directed by Seijun Suzuki and starring Tamio Kawachi and Yoshiko Yatsu in her film debut. The story follows Jirō, a rebellious high schooler, in his sadomasochistic and criminal misadventures, specifically as they relate to his girlfriend, mother and her lover. The film was produced and distributed by the Nikkatsu Company. Kinema Junpo called it an early masterpiece in Suzuki's career.

Plot

On sweltering summer day, a gang of high school delinquents rove through Shinjuku. One, Jirō Sugita, harasses one of the girls, leading to an argument. Jirō leaves the group and returns home, where he lives with his single mother, Misayo. Misayo is the mistress of Keigo Nanbara, a businessman, and Jiro's disapproval of their relationship and feelings of jealousy leave him constantly at odds with both of them. Jirō gets in a fight with Nanbara, tears violently through the house, and steals money from Misayo. Toshimi Tani, a girl from the gang, acts on her crush on Jirō and the two initiate an intimate relationship, though Jirō is decidedly cooler towards the affair than Toshimi. At Misayo's request, Nanbara lectures Jirō about his disreputable lifestyle and tries to set him straight, but is met with mockery.

The following day, Nanbara and Misayo and Jirō and his friends go separately to the same Zushi beach resort. Etsuko, a college student who desperately needs money for an abortion, leads Nanbara to an empty summer home under the pretense of connecting him with Jirō, who he has been searching for in order to make peace. When they arrive, she strips to her undergarments and reveals her real motive was to sell herself to him to obtain money to pay for the abortion. The kindhearted Nanbara refuses her advances but gives her the money she needs. At that moment, Jirō bursts in with his mother in tow and gleefully exposes Nanbara as a philandering liar. However, though Misayo is upset, her genuine love for Nanbara is unshaken, and she begs him to stay with her instead. Enraged and wracked with guilt, Jirō and Toshimi flee and steal a car. Nanbara pursues them; Etsuko leaves with the money, but is waylaid by a group of delinquents who steal it from her. Nanbara finally catches up to Jirō in a hotel room, where he continues to try and reason with Jirō even as the boy alternately mocks him and kisses Toshimi in front of him. When Nanbara is undeterred, Jirō explodes and brutally assaults him with a wrench. Believing he has killed him Jirō and Toshimi escape in the car, and with the police in pursuit, Jirō begins driving at reckless speed until Toshimi screams in fear, begging to be let out of the car. He seems to have a change of heart, but then deliberately drives into the path of an oncoming truck. The moment before he dies, he screams out "Mom!"

Distraught and in pain, Etsuko collapses at the entrance to the subway and falls down a staircase. She is taken to the same hospital as Nanbara, who survived the assault, and even in his gravely wounded state begs the police to forgive Jirō for his actions. Etsuko also survives, but has a miscarriage. The next day at a local bar the youngsters frequented, a journalist for a disreputable paper tells the owner that Jirō is dead. He is disheartened with the current youth culture, but knows that the salacious details of the story will be eaten up by the public. Musing over how he will write the story, he considers starting it with "Today, goodwill between people can't exist anywhere. Everything goes wrong."

Production
In 1956, Nikkatsu Studios made three popular films in the Sun Tribe genre, focused on a contemporary youth subculture noted for their affinity for beach life and jazz music and their progressive attitudes toward sex. The films met with public outcry for moral reasons, and a fourth production was halted at the behest of the Eirin, or Motion Picture Code of Ethics Committee. However, the genre later resurged and included Everything Goes Wrong. The film was based on the author Akira Ichijō's story High Teen Mistress ( Hai tīn jōfu), adapted for the screen by Seiji Hoshikawa. Former fashion model Yoshiko Yatsu made her feature film debut. Hit singer Kyu Sakamoto has a cameo appearance, performing a musical number. The film employed an improvisational jazz score and free-flowing camera work in a semi-documentary style.

Release
The film was released by Nikkatsu in Japan on October 8, 1960. The film journal Kinema Junpo posited that any deficiencies in the story were overshadowed by Seijun Suzuki's unique directorial style. They placed it in the Japanese New Wave and called it an early masterpiece in Suzuki's oeuvre. In writing his book on Japanese filmmakers, Chris D. called it "A find, and highly recommended." He noted in it common elements with Nagisa Oshima's own Sun Tribe film Cruel Story of Youth (also 1960) but found Everything Goes Wrong to be less pretentious.

Nikkatsu released Everything Goes Wrong on DVD in Japan on May 21, 2005. It included a photo gallery and the original film trailer. The release was done in conjunction with the release of three other films directed by Seijun Suzuki and in anticipation of the following year's 50th anniversary of his directorial debut.

Soundtrack

On February 23, 2007, the Japanese label Think! Records reissued the soundtrack on CD as a part of its Cine Jazz series, which featured 1960s Nikkatsu Action film scores. The music was derived from Keitarō Miho's film score. Tracks 29 and 30 are bonus tracks.

Track listing

References

External links
 
 
 Everything Goes Wrong  at the Japanese Movie Database

1960 films
Japanese black-and-white films
1960s Japanese-language films
1960 drama films
Films based on short fiction
Films directed by Seijun Suzuki
Nikkatsu films
1960s Japanese films